The Minister of Education of Peru is in charge of the Ministry of Education within the Council of Ministers of Peru. The building's headquarters, formerly in the Javier Alzamora Valdez Building, are now located in San Borja District. The current minister is Rosendo Serna.

List of Ministers of Instruction, Charity and Ecclesiastical Business

List of Ministers of Education

See also
 Ministry of Education (Peru)

References

External links

 Ministerio de Educación (in Spanish)

Lists of government ministers of Peru